Fábio Gilvan do Nascimento Silva (born 13 September 1983), known simply as Fábio, was a Brazilian footballer.

External links

 Brazilian FA Database
 Player profile on FK Rabotnički web page

1983 births
Living people
Brazilian footballers
Brazilian expatriate footballers
Sportspeople from Recife
Association football midfielders
Mogi Mirim Esporte Clube players
NK Varaždin players
Expatriate footballers in Croatia
FK Vardar players
FK Rabotnički players
Expatriate footballers in North Macedonia
Brazilian expatriate sportspeople in Croatia
Brazilian expatriate sportspeople in North Macedonia